Luke Losey is a film director and lighting designer from London.

Background and early life 
Losey is the son of the film producer Gavrik Losey and the former British ballerina Sally Chesterton, and the grandson of the film director Joseph Losey and the fashion designer Elizabeth Hawes. He is the nephew of the actor, Joshua Losey, and the brother of Marek Losey, who is also a film director. He grew up in Paddington, London, where he attended Hallfield Infants and Junior School in Royal Oak. He then attended Hampstead comprehensive in Camden, North London. Suffering from dyslexia, he left school without qualifications.

Early career 
As a child he was obsessed with science fiction. In 1975 a chance viewing of Kubrick's 2001 and the gift of a Brownie camera led to him becoming interested with capturing images.
After leaving school in 1984 he worked as a runner on film sets and for production companies. He worked on Derek Jarman's film Caravaggio as the floor runner. He spent much of the late 1980s working as an art department runner/assistant on films, music videos and ads. Involvement in the early rave and squatting scene in north London led to him getting involved in lighting and film projection.

In the early 1990s he met the electronic band Orbital.  With video artist Giles Thacker he created the visual elements of Orbital's live show, a fusion of carefully prepared visuals and lighting that flew in the face of the staid fractal influenced imagery of the day, with wry observations on everyday life.  .

In 1998, Losey co-directed a music video for Orbital's single The Box, which starred Tilda Swinton and was inspired by time-lapse animation. The promo won a silver spire for the Best Short Film at the San Francisco film festival, and was nominated for the best video award at the 1998 MTV awards. It also closed the Edinburgh film festival, opened the London film festival, screened at Sundance and was seen at almost every festival that year. In 1999 Losey created a second music video for Orbital called Style, with Jonathan Charles as director of animation. Style also uses stop motion animation throughout and is a surreal take on Kafka's The Metamorphosis, influenced by the work of Jan Švankmajer. Both The Box and Style continue to be widely shown.

Later work 
Luke directed many music videos in the late 1990s and 2000s, including work for William Orbit (directing the video for his 1999 version of Adagio for Strings) and Mercury Rev. After a period directing TV adverts, Losey moved with his young family to Australia, where he continued to direct and pursue photography. However, he periodically returned to the UK to design live shows for bands, including The Libertines, Turin Brakes, The Verve, and Magazine and Mott the Hoople. In 2009 he shot the video for the cover of Gang of Four's Damaged Goods by Gaz Coombes and Danny Goffey's side project The Hotrats.

His commercial work has included a number of internet viral campaigns, a return to photography and advertising work and several short films, most notably i in 2010, a two-minute short of an eyeball featuring industrial sounds, which won the Best Sound Design award at the Hamburg Film Festival and was shown at the Rushes Short Film Festival and the Ann Arbor Film Festival, and The Promise in 2011, also shown at the Ann Arbor Film festival. The Promise garnered critical acclaim but its dark subject matter – a slow-motion depiction of a woman being executed – limited its distribution. Losey, who is now UK based, exhibited work at the Latitude Contemporary Art Exhibition in 2010.

Luke has directed a major 3D experiential advertisement for Ralph Lauren and viral/cinema ads for Mulberry and Nokia.

In late 2013 he directed a short teaser film of Jessica Albarn's fairy tale book The Boy in the Oak. The film was narrated by Jude Law with music by Damon Albarn.

In 2015 Losey directed a kickstarter financed dramatic short film shot on 35mm film by Serge Teulon starring Jonathan Pryce and Sara Kestelman entitled 'One Last Dance'. Released in 2017 the film played at film festivals globally, receiving a number of awards including for its cinematography.

In 2018 Losey directed The Clock, a music film for electronic band 08:58 starting Cillian Murphy in a dystopian Mr.Ben fantasy.

In 2022 Luke directed the UKMVA nominated animation 'Smiley's world' promo for Orbitals 30th anniversary, the animation director was Tim Varlow. The animation is set in alternative 1989, during a period in British subculture that bridged the gap between free festivals and big raves. The music samples the ‘A Trip Round Acid House’ edition of ‘World In Action’ – the ITV documentary about the Acid House scene, with a 20-year-old Paul Hartnoll recalling being beaten up by police at a house party in Sevenoaks, Kent. The events portrayed in the film reflect Losey's own experiences of the period, with the animation style deliberately reflecting the strong DIY ethos of the time. The narrative is a dystopian comedy featuring sock puppets, high-end CGI, background stock footage, specially filmed elements, stop-motion and stills photography. Also in 2022, Luke directed the promo for the Orbital Sleaford Mods collaboration 'Dirty Rat'. Luke has now started collaborating with the Orbital on their live show as content and lighting director, after an absence of over a decade.

Also in development through 2022 / 23 is a script from an idea by Losey called 'The Boy who loved dinosaurs', written by Klaus Fried. Part ghost story, part road-movie, this is the redemptive tale of a metaphysical connection between two men a continent apart and the tragedy that bonds them. Losey is concurrently developing a drama titled 'Subject 8' (subsequently renamed 'ZOYA), penned by Justin Villiers from an idea by Losey. Zoya is a dystopian fairy tale exploring the rise and fall of a parapsychological research institute and its inmates in soviet Siberia. "The secret Kulagina Brain Institute is located in a remote region of Siberia’s Ural mountains, during the 1950s the institute was the world's leading research facility for ESP and parapsychology, by the mid 1970s after years of insupportable claims, the institute was discredited and fell into decline". In May 2022 the film received development money, first drafts of a script are expected in early 2023.

References

External links 
 CV on Scriptfirst.com

1968 births
Living people
English film directors
English music video directors
People from Paddington
English people of American descent